The , also known as the  or , is a wide plateau situated between the Tama Hills and the Sagami River in Kanagawa Prefecture, Japan.

References

Landforms of Kanagawa Prefecture
Plateaus of Japan